Dicerca lurida is a species of black coloured beetle from Chrysochroinae subfamily which is  long and is known for feeding on various hickory species. The species fly from April to May during which they also sunning on tree trunks and logs. The life stage of the species is at least three years.

References

Beetles described in 1775
Taxa named by Johan Christian Fabricius
Buprestidae